A list of films produced in South Korea in 1994:

See also
1994 in South Korea
1994 in Film

External links

 1994-1995 at www.koreanfilm.org

1994
South Korean
1994 in South Korea